{{Infobox concert
| concert_tour_name = Ten Times Crazier Tour
| image             = Ten Times Crazier Tour poster.jpg
| image_size        = 200px
| landscape         = yes
| image_caption     = 2013 tour poster
| artist            = Blake Shelton
| location          = North America
| album             = Based on a True Story…
| start_date        = July 19, 2013
| end_date          = June 26, 2015
| number_of_legs    = 2
| number_of_shows   = 62
| gross             = $17,999,504
| last_tour         = Well Lit & Amplified Tour(2012)
| this_tour         = Ten Times Crazier Tour(2013–14)
| next_tour         =
| Misc              = 
}}

The Ten Times Crazier Tour ' is a concert tour by American Country music singer, Blake Shelton. The tour is in support of his eighth studio album, Based on a True Story…''. The tour began on July 19, 2013, in Virginia Beach, Virginia and ended on June 26, 2015, in Dover, Delaware.

Background
The tour was first announced on January 17, 2013. Shelton response for the tour, "My fans, country radio, friends, family, you name it -- they know I love to perform, "With 'The Voice' schedule, I was not able to go out and perform as much as I wanted last year but I plan to make up for it this year. This summer is going to be a blast."

Opening acts for the 2013 leg were Easton Corbin and Jana Kramer. The 2014 leg of the tour was first announced in January 2014 and will be sponsored by Pepsi. The Band Perry, Neal McCoy, and Dan + Shay will serve as opening acts for the second leg.

It was announced on April 10, 2014 that Shelton would perform a free show on the beach in Atlantic City, New Jersey on July 31, 2014

Opening acts
2013 
Easton Corbin 
Jana Kramer 
2014
The Band Perry 
Neal McCoy 
Dan + Shay 
MacKenzie Porter (select dates)

Setlist
{{hidden
| headercss = background: #ccccff; font-size: 100%; width: 59%;
| contentcss = text-align: left; font-size: 100%; width: 75%;
| header = 2013
| content =  
 "All About Tonight"
 "The More I Drink"
 "Over"
 "Kiss My Country Ass"
 "She Wouldn't Be Gone"
 "Mine Would Be You"
 "Playboys of the Southwestern World"
 "Some Beach"
 "Ol' Red"
 "Who Are You When I'm Not Looking"
 "Sure Be Cool If You Did"
 "Hillbilly Bone"
 "Over You"
 "Austin"
 "Drink on It"
 "Home" (Michael Bublé cover)
 "Honey Bee"
 "Boys 'Round Here"
Encore 
 "Footloose" (Kenny Loggins cover)
 "God Gave Me You" (Dave Barnes cover)
}}
{{hidden
| headercss = background: #ccccff; font-size: 100%; width: 59%;
| contentcss = text-align: left; font-size: 100%; width: 75%;
| header = 2014
| content = 
 "All About Tonight"
 "The More I Drink"
 "Doin' What She Likes"
 "She Wouldn't Be Gone"
 "Kiss My Country Ass"
 "Mine Would Be You"
 "Nobody But Me"
 "Some Beach"
 "Ol' Red"
 "Who Are You When I'm Not Looking"
 "Hillbilly Bone"
 "Sure Be Cool If You Did"
 "Neon Light" (select shows)
 "My Eyes"
 "Over You"
 "Austin"
 "Drink on It"
 "Home"
 "Honey Bee"
 "Boys 'Round Here"
Encore
 "Footloose" (Kenny Loggins cover)
 "God Gave Me You"
}}

Notes
On July 27, 2013, Cassadee Pope surprised the crowd and performed her song, "Wasting All These Tears".
On July 31, 2014, Danielle Bradbery surprised the crowd and performed her song, "The Heart of Dixie".

Tour dates

 
List of festivals and fairs
 This concert is a part of the Chippewa Valley Country Festival
 This concert is a part of the Dauphin Countryfest
 This concert is a part of the RBC Royal Bank Bluesfest
 This concert is a part of the Cavendish Beach Music Festival

Box office score data

Critical reception
St. Louis Todays Amanda St. Amand says that, "He put that charisma on display before a rollicking and sold-out horde on Friday night at Verizon Wireless Amphitheater with a "Ten Times Crazier" tour that proved he's a headliner well-worth his top billing... (There's a reason he's country music's reigning male vocalist and entertainer of the year.)" "Blake has such a stage presence and entertains and interacts with the crowd so well... He could follow behind the greats like George Strait, Johnny Cash, & Merle Haggard", says Melissa Gibson of All Access Magazine.
Melissa Ruggieri of Access Atlanta says that Shelton's "voice is strong enough – a supple instrument that contains more range than most of his CMA-winning peers – but what makes Shelton such a delight is his interaction with the crowd and tremendous sense of humor."

References

External links 
 

2013 concert tours
2014 concert tours
2015 concert tours
Blake Shelton concert tours